Marco Weber (born 28 September 1982) is a German long track speed skater who participates in international competitions.

Personal records

Career highlights

World Single Distance Championships
2003 - Berlin, 21st at 5000 m
2005 - Inzell, 20th at 5000 m
2005 - Inzell, 7th at 10000 m
European Allround Championships
2005 - Heerenveen, 15th
2006 - Hamar, 22nd
2008 - Kolomna,  15th
World Junior Allround Championships
2001 - Groningen, 11th
2002 - Collalbo, 4th
National Championships
2004 - Erfurt,  3rd at 10000 m
2005 - Berlin,  1st at 5000 m
2005 - Inzell,  1st at allround
2006 - Berlin,  1st at 5000 m
2007 - Erfurt,  2nd at 5000 m
2007 - Erfurt,  1st at 10000 m
2007 - Berlin,  2nd at allround
2008 - Inzell,  3rd at 1500 m allround
2008 - Inzell,  2nd at 5000 m allround
European Youth-23 Games
2004 - Göteborg,  1st at 5000 m
2004 - Göteborg,  1st at 10000 m
Nordic Junior Games
2000 - Chemnitz,  2nd at 5000 m

External links
Homepage
Weber at Jakub Majerski's Speedskating Database
Weber at SkateResults.com
Weber at effesport.nl

1982 births
German male speed skaters
Living people
Speed skaters at the 2010 Winter Olympics
Olympic speed skaters of Germany
Place of birth missing (living people)